Jabal Al Mukaber is a Palestinian football team from the city of East Jerusalem, that plays in the West Bank Premier League.

In 2010, the club won the West Bank Premier League but more recently, it has been unable to play games in Jerusalem due to restrictions on players with Palestinian Authority identification, preventing them from entering Jerusalem. Matches are now played at the Faisal Al-Husseini International Stadium in Al-Ram.

In 2015 the club played in the West Bank Premier League.

Achievements
West Bank Premier League: 2
Winner: 2010, 2023.

Performance in International competitions
AFC President's Cup: 1 appearance
2011: 3° in Group Stage

References

Football clubs in the West Bank
Sport in Jerusalem